Made in Lagos is the fourth studio album by Nigerian singer Wizkid. It was released on 30 October 2020 by Starboy Entertainment and RCA Records. The album features guest appearances from Burna Boy, Skepta, H.E.R., Ella Mai, Tay Iwar, Projexx, Tems, Damian Marley, Terri and was executive produced by P2J. The deluxe edition was released on 27 August 2021. It features additional guest appearances from Buju and Justin Bieber. In support of the album, Wizkid embarked on the Made in Lagos Tour (2021–2022). The album received a nomination at the 64th Annual Grammy Awards for Best Global Music Album.

Background
In late 2019, Wizkid released the singles "Joro" and "Ghetto Love", initially teased them as promotional singles for Made in Lagos.

On 6 December 2019, Wizkid's label Starboy Entertainment released the EP Soundman Vol. 1, centering mainly on Wizkid, and containing features from Chronixx, and a variety of other artists. It was cited as a marketing strategy to test the Afro-European market for Made in Lagos.

Release and promotion 
Made in Lagos was initially set to be released on October 15. The album launch was later postponed until 30 October due to the Nigerian End SARS protests nationwide.

Wizkid promoted Made in Lagos with his Made in Lagos Tour, which started on 10 September 2021, performing in  New York City, Boston, Toronto, and Los Angeles.

Singles
Wizkid released a collaboration with American singer, H.E.R., titled "Smile" on 16 July 2020 as the albums lead single. The song made its debut at No. 3 in the first week of launch of the UK Afrobeats Singles Chart, and was featured on Barack Obama's 2020 summer playlist. On 17 September, Wizkid released the single "No Stress".

"Essence" featuring Tems, was released as the albums fourth single on 9 April 2021. On 13 August 2021 a remix of the song, featuring Canadian singer Justin Bieber, was released. The song became the highest-charting single on the billboard Hot 100 by an African act peaking at number nine on Billboard Hot 100. "Essence" was also the first Nigerian song in history to chart on the Billboard Hot 100 and the Billboard Global 200.<ref
name="Billboard"></ref>

Critical reception

Made in Lagos received favorable reviews for its cohesive  themes, particularly ruling out the flaws on Wizkid's previous works, Sounds from the Other Side and Soundman Vol. 1.

Pulse Nigeria wrote: "On Made in Lagos he promotes culture and globalisation, with the album also containing themes of love, focus, goodwill, gratitude and grace. He implements the use of live instrumentation on Made in Lagos and explores a range of genres. Joey Akan of Pitchfork stated that "Wizkid balances the formula to unite home and abroad with big pop songs that can compete across cultures and an underlying theme that embraces his roots".

Year-end rankings

Awards
At the 27th annual South African  Music Awards, Made in Lagos received a nomination for the Rest of Africa Award. 
It also received a nomination at the 64th Annual Grammy Awards for Best Global Music Album. At the 7th annual African Entertainment Awards USA in 2021, Made in Lagos won Album Of The Year at the ceremony.

Made in Lagos Deluxe Edition received two nominations at 15th ceremony of The Headies, for Album of the Year, and Best Afrobeat Pop Album (Nigeria), a new category.

Commercial performance
Within one week of release, Made in Lagos broke several African streaming records; it became the first African album to debut on the Spotify Global Album chart, debuting within the top ten. The album surpassed 100 million streams across five platforms nine days after release, a rare milestone for Afro-pop artists.

It debuted at number 15 on the UK Albums Chart with over 4,100 album-equivalent units and number 80 on the US Billboard 200 with over 10,000 album-equivalent units. Following the release of the deluxe edition, the album sold an additional 17,000 units in the United States, peaking at number 28 on the US Billboard 200. It has spent over 90 weeks  on the Billboard world albums' chart.

Track listing

Charts

Certifications

References

2020 albums
Wizkid albums
RCA Records albums